(born 1950) was the chief copper trader at Sumitomo Corporation, one of the largest trading companies in Japan. He was known as "Mr. Copper" because of his aggressive trading style, and as "Mr. Five Percent" because that is how much of the world's yearly supply he controlled.

On June 13, 1996, Sumitomo Corporation reported a loss of US$1.8 billion in unauthorized copper trading by Hamanaka on the London Metal Exchange. His culpability as to whether this responsibility was authorized is in doubt.

In September 1996, Sumitomo disclosed that the company's financial losses were much higher, at $2.6 billion (285 billion yen).

Hamanaka was sentenced to eight years in prison in 1998 and was released in July 2005, one year early.

See also 
 Kweku Adoboli lost $2 billion for UBS
 Jérôme Kerviel
 Nick Leeson caused a loss of £827 million for Barings Bank, leading to its collapse
 List of trading losses
 Sumitomo copper affair

References

External links 
 "How Copper Came a Cropper: Sumitomo's robber-baron tactics make the case for regulation" by Paul Krugman, MIT

1950 births
20th-century Japanese businesspeople
Japanese white-collar criminals
Living people
Rogue traders